Imes or IMES may refer to:

People
Birney Imes (b. 1951), American photographer
Brad Imes (b. 1977), American martial artist
Elmer Imes (1883–1941), American physicist 
Kenny Imes (b. 1947), American politician
Mo'Nique Imes (b. 1967), American comedian and actress

Places
Imes Bridge, a wooden covered bridge in Madison County, Iowa
Imes, Kansas, a community in the United States

Organizations
 Institute for Medical Engineering and Science, part of the Massachusetts Institute of Technology.
 Instituto Municipal de Ensino Superior de São Caetano do Sul, former name of a Brazilian university
 Irish Marine Emergency Service, former name of the Irish Coast Guard

Other
IMes, an organic compound that is a common ligand in organometallic chemistry

See also
 IME (disambiguation), some meanings have plural "Imes"